Bright is a former electorate for the South Australian House of Assembly. It was named in honour of Charles Bright, at various times South Australian Supreme Court Judge, Flinders University Chancellor, Health Commission chairman, and Electoral Boundaries Commission chairman. Prior to its 2018 abolition, the seat covered southern coastal suburbs of Adelaide including Brighton, North Brighton, South Brighton, Hallett Cove, Hove, Kingston Park, Marino, Seacliff, Seacliff Park and part of Somerton Park.

The electorate was created at the 1983 redistribution, to replace the abolished seat of Brighton, as a marginal Liberal seat with a notional one percent two-party margin. However, it was won by the Labor's Derek Robertson at the 1985 election, before being won by Liberal Wayne Matthew at the 1989 election. He held the seat until his retirement at the 2006 election. Liberal shadow minister Angus Redford left the South Australian Legislative Council to contest the seat but was defeated by Labor's Chloë Fox from a 14.4 percent swing, the largest in the state, amidst a statewide landslide averaging a 7.7 percent swing.

After the enactment of the "fairness clause," Bright's boundaries were frequently altered by the Electoral Commission of South Australia in order to produce "fairer" electoral boundaries. A shift of a few kilometres along O'Halloran Hill significantly altered the seat's political landscape. Moving the seat to the south shifted the margin in favour of Labor, while moving it to the north benefited the Liberals. As evidence of this, the redistribution ahead of the 2010 election pared Fox's margin from safe 9.2 percent–just on the edge of being safe–to 6.6 percent. At that election, the Liberals picked up a 6.2 percent swing, just short of picking up the seat, with Labor retaining the seat on a 0.4 percent margin, making Bright Labor's most marginal seat following the 2010 election. Liberal David Speirs won the seat from a 3.7 percent swing at the 2014 election.

Bright was abolished at the 2018 state election following the 2016 electoral redistribution. On paper, it was replaced by Gibson.

Speirs decided to contest Black, which had absorbed much of Bright's southern portion, at the 2018 state election.

Members for Bright

Election results

References

External links
 ABC profile for Bright: 2014
 ECSA profile for Bright: 2014
 Poll Bludger profile for Bright: 2014

Former electoral districts of South Australia
1985 establishments in Australia
2018 disestablishments in Australia
Constituencies established in 1985
Constituencies disestablished in 2018